An Antarctic oasis is a large area naturally free of snow and ice in the otherwise ice-covered continent of Antarctica.

Geology
In Antarctica there are, in addition to mountaintops and nunataks, other natural snow- and ice-free areas often referred to as "Antarctic oases" or "dry valleys". These areas are surrounded by the Antarctic ice sheet or, in coastal areas, are situated between the ice sheet and the Antarctic ice shelves.

Antarctic oases and dry valleys develop in areas with particular regional weather patterns and geography. These areas have very low humidity and precipitation. Although these areas are very cold, sufficient solar energy is absorbed by the ground to melt what little snow does fall, or else it is scoured or sublimated by katabatic winds, leaving the underlying rock exposed.

Despite usually extreme aridity, some plants, in the form of bryophytes and lichens, can survive in Antarctic oases.

Geography
The larger oases (with their respective areas) are:

 McMurdo Dry Valleys (approx. ), Victoria Land
 Cape Hallett, northern Victoria Land
 Bunger Hills (approx. ), between Wilkes Land and Queen Mary Land
 Holme Bay, Mac. Robertson Land
 Vestfold Hills (approx. ), Princess Elizabeth Land
 Larsemann Hills, Princess Elizabeth Land
 Stillwell Hills (approx. ), Kemp Land
 Schirmacher Oasis (approx. ), Princess Astrid Coast, Queen Maud Land

References
Riffenburgh, Beau Encyclopedia of the Antarctic, vol II (Routledge, New York, 2007)

Further reading  
 Rostislav D. Kouznetsov, The structure of the lower ABL over antarctic oasis during the summer, IOP Conf. Series: Earth and Environmental Science 1 (2008) 012035 doi:10.1088/1755-1307/1/1/012035
 Bernadette Hince, The Antarctic Dictionary: A Complete Guide to Antarctic English, P 19

External links
 About Antarctic oases and Dry valleys, British Antarctic Survey